Voorheis is a surname. Notable people with the surname include: 

Bernie Voorheis (1922–2010), American basketball player
Isaac I. Voorheis (1799–1886), American politician

See also
Voorhees (surname)
Voorhies (disambiguation)
Voorhis